Sobita Gautam is a Nepalese politician and member of Rastriya Swatantra Party. She was elected to the House of Representatives in 2022 from Kathmandu 2. At 27, she is the youngest directly-elected member in the House of Representatives.

Gautam is a youth activist and a lawyer by profession. She hosted the television show Swasthya Sarokar for Nepal Television for over four years. In the past, she has written about the need to institutionalize and regulate assisted reproductive technology in Nepal..

See also 

 Rastriya Swatantra Party
 Toshima Karki

References

Rastriya Swatantra Party politicians
Nepal MPs 2022–present
Living people
1995 births